Pirjo is a Finnish female given name. Its nameday is celebrated on 7 October. It began to be used in the 1920s, and it reached its peak of popularity in the 1940s and 1950s. As of 2013 there are 34,650 women with this name in Finland.

Origin and variants
The name Pirjo originated as a short form of Birgitta and Piritta, Finnish versions of Brigid. A common variant is Pirkko.

Notable people
Notable people with this name include:
 Pirjo Ala-Kapee-Hakulinen (born 1944), Finnish politician
 Pirjo Häggman, Finnish sprinter
 Pirjo Honkasalo, Finnish filmmaker
 Pirjo Leppikangas, Finnish football defender
 Pirjo Muranen, Finnish cross country skier
 Pirjo Ruotsalainen, Finnish orienteering competitor
 Pirjo Seppä, Finnish orienteering competitor

References

Finnish feminine given names